Better Off Ted is an American satirical sitcom series, created by Victor Fresco, who also served as the show's executive producer. The series ran on the ABC network from March 18, 2009, to January 26, 2010.

Better Off Ted focuses on the protagonist, Ted Crisp (Jay Harrington), a single father and the well-respected and beloved head of a research and development department at the fictional, soulless conglomerate of Veridian Dynamics. Ted narrates the series' events by regularly breaking the fourth wall and directly addressing the audience on camera.  Supporting characters include Ted's supervisor Veronica Palmer (Portia de Rossi), co-worker and love interest Linda Zwordling (Andrea Anders), his daughter Rose (Isabella Acres), and laboratory scientists Phillip Myman (Jonathan Slavin) and Lem Hewitt (Malcolm Barrett).

The series received critical acclaim, with particular praise going towards its witty and satirical humor. Its second season holds a score of 84 out of 100 on Metacritic. However, despite such positive feedback, the show's debut drew in only 5.64 million viewers and continued to have extremely low ratings. Although many expressed skepticism that it would return, it was renewed for a second season. On May 13, 2010, ABC officially canceled the series due to low viewing figures. Two episodes were unaired in the United States, but are available to view on Hulu, Amazon Video on Demand, Microsoft Movies & TV, and iTunes.

Plot
Better Off Ted is a satirical workplace comedy, centred around the employees of a stereotypically evil megacorporation of Veridian Dynamics.

Veridian Dynamics experiments on its employees, twists the truth, and will stop at nothing to achieve its goals. It has been mentioned that Veridian has swayed presidential elections, created killer pandas and robots, and weaponized pumpkins, and that there are only three governments left in the world more powerful than Veridian. Although not promoted as such, and rarely the focus of storylines, the show's frequent references to futuristic technologies, killer robots, sentient computers, etc., places Better Off Ted partly in the science fiction genre.

Most of the characters are fully aware of Veridian's nature, and often try to manipulate the system in order to stop bad things from happening to them (and sometimes to mitigate the evil effects of some of Veridian's projects). They are also all susceptible to the potential rewards the company can offer despite the consequences of their actions, such as the company's attempt to hire Lem's mother, or the company's introduction of scented light bulbs with known flaws. Much of the comedy of the show comes from the characters' navigation of these morally ambiguous areas.

Jay Harrington, who plays Ted Crisp on the show, serves both as a main character and as an on-camera narrator. Throughout the show, he breaks the fourth wall and speaks directly to viewers, offering inside information and observations while the action continues around him. Another plot element involves the use of mock commercials for Veridian Dynamics, thematically related to individual episodes and placed at the end or beginning of actual commercial breaks in most episodes.

Episodes

Series overview

Season 1 (2009)

Season 2 (2009–10)

Cast

 Jay Harrington as Theodore Margaret "Ted" Crisp: Ted is the titular character, and also the show's narrator. He is the senior vice-president of the Research and Development department at Veridian Dynamics, and is well respected and loved by most of the employees – and even members of the otherwise difficult upper management. He balances his desire to maintain his position at the company with his feeling that he must demonstrate a moral center to his daughter. He has had sexual relations with his immediate supervisor, although she remains emotionally distant. He also has interest in Linda, who was a new hire to Veridian Dynamics at the launch of the series.
 Portia de Rossi as Veronica Palmer: Veronica is Ted's boss and immediate supervisor at Veridian Dynamics. She maintains a fierce and unapproachable workplace demeanor, and many employees have a deep fear of her. She seems cold and calculating, but it is also clear that she has more than grudging respect for Ted, and often recognizes what moral action is necessary to maintain balance in the workplace. An ongoing subplot touched on sporadically in the first season but more frequently in the second sees Veronica becoming a mentor to Linda and, to a lesser degree, Rose.
 Andrea Anders as Linda Katherine Zwordling: Linda is a tester in one of Veridian's departments. She finds herself very attracted to Ted, but maintains other relationships and reminds Ted repeatedly that he has rejected the idea of a workplace romance with her. She seems to be a bit of an outsider to the corporate culture. Often she demands that Ted consider the horrible ramifications of the company policies or activities. Her relationship with the scientists is strained by her rejection of the weird things they do in the name of science. Despite this, she finds herself increasingly looking at Veronica as a mentor as the series progresses.
 Jonathan Slavin as Dr. Philip "Phil" Myman: Phil is one of the laboratory scientists in Veridian's Research Department. He is usually working or hanging out with Lem, who works with him on almost every project. He generally does whatever he can to be accepted and avoid conflicts. He is married, and makes frequent references to his wife, who seems to hate him. In season 2's episode 6, "Beating a Dead Workforce", we learn she was a member of Mossad.
 Malcolm Barrett as Dr. Lem Hewitt: Lem is one of the laboratory scientists in Veridian's Research Department. He is best friends with his lab partner Phil, who works with him on almost every project. Lem is just as conflict-averse as Phil, and seems just as willing to roll over and take whatever abuse the company has to offer. He grew up in the shadow of his mother (Khandi Alexander) a renowned scientist.
 Isabella Acres as Rose Crisp: Rose is Ted's daughter. She attends the Veridian Dynamics daycare program when her nanny is not available, but prefers to stay at home. According to Ted, "her mom ran off to Africa to go save the world." She is often the voice of reason on the show. When Ted talks with her about work she points out the terrible choices the company makes, and often helps Ted focus on what needs to be done to set things straight. She attends Eugene Debs Elementary School. In season 2, she tells Veronica that she's 8 years old.

Production

Origin
Victor Fresco, the show's creator, has cited his being a new parent as inspiration for the show. In an interview with NPR, he discussed how having a kid piqued his interest to develop a show about the disconnection between a person's public and personal lives, such as how parents teach their kids to be moral, yet work for giant corporations. According to Fresco, Ted Crisp is the single father and his daughter serves as his moral compass. Fresco stated that since he's worked for a few giant companies, he didn't base Veridian Dynamics on any specific corporation. The show's name was based on the idea that a person is better off if they are Ted, that essentially the average person wants to be Ted. Fresco has stated that he wasn't a fan of the show's title, but hadn't spoken of changing it.

Casting

In casting his crew, Fresco and his team worked fairly quickly. "You don't have a lot of time to cast, unfortunately, and it's the most important thing in the show, I think." says Fresco, "Good casting can transcend mediocre material but the best material in the world cannot transcend the mediocre casting. It's all about casting and I think we got really lucky in all five of these regulars."

Fresco approached Jonathan Slavin, with whom he had previously worked on the sitcom Andy Richter Controls the Universe, about playing the role of Phil. Being a fan of Slavin's work, he thought he'd be great for the role. Andrea Anders, whom Fresco previously enjoyed on The Class, and Malcolm Barrett were cast for the roles of Linda and Lem respectively. Portia de Rossi met with Fresco about the role of Veronica. Fresco assessed during their meeting that de Rossi was completely convinced that the role was perfect for her and that she was born to play it. He thought de Rossi nailed the role and cast her. When asked what drew her to the role, de Rossi replied, "I'm really attracted to strong women." De Rossi further went on to say, "I kind of had to throw myself at [Fresco]. I told him I'd played this character who had similar qualities, very work driven, strong, insensitive, slightly chilly. I had to convince him I could play this character well and could play a character of this nature." Jay Harrington was the first person Fresco met with when trying to cast someone as Ted Crisp. Although Fresco really liked Harrington, he decided to see more people before casting the role. After five weeks, Harrington was cast.

Cancellation
The series was officially canceled by ABC on May 13, 2010. In an interview with New York Magazine, Victor Fresco, the show's creator, was asked why he thought the show didn't catch on. He responded, "I think not enough people knew about it. It wasn’t like we had a lot of people watch it and they didn’t come back to it. If anything, I think we were building slowly, but to me the way TV works is you spend a lot of money advertising and promoting, or you have to let a show stay some place for a long period of time and an audience slowly comes to it. And I don’t think we got either of that". Fresco also added, "I still feel there’s an audience out there for it, because I know that the people who liked it, liked it a lot."

At the time of its cancellation, two episodes of Better Off Ted had yet to be broadcast by ABC. The network announced on May 27, 2010, that it would air the two episodes back-to-back on June 17, 2010, contingent on the 2010 NBA Finals not requiring a seventh game. Ultimately a seventh game was needed, and thus ABC did not air the final two episodes of the series.

DVD release

{| class="wikitable"
|+ Better Off Ted: The Complete Second Season|-
|colspan="2" width="30%" valign="top" | Set details:13 episodes
2 disc set
|colspan="3" valign=top| Features:' Multiple Formats
 AC-3
 Color
 Dolby
 DTS Surround Sound
 Widescreen
 NTSC
|-
!rowspan="2" width="25%"|Release dates:
!width="25%"|Region 1
!width="25%"|Region 2
!width="25%"|Region 4
|-
|align="center" | November 25, 2014
|align="center" | 
|align="center" | 
|}

Reception

Critical response
Critics have praised Better Off Teds witty and satirical humour, as well as its cast. According to Metacritic, which assigns a rating out of 100 to reviews from mainstream critics, the show's first season holds a score of 68 out of 100, indicating "generally favorable reviews", based on 21 reviews. Misha Davenport of the Chicago Sun-Times wrote favorably of the show, comparing its characters to those of the highly acclaimed show Arrested Development. Linda Stasi of the New York Post gave the show three-and-a-half out of four stars, lauding the cast and simply referring to it as "a very funny comedy". Ken Tucker of Entertainment Weekly gave the show a B+, stating "'Better Off Ted' is certainly the most original sitcom to come along in a while." Robert Bianco from USA Today referred to the show as "well-cast and reasonably entertaining."

After returning for a second season, the show became even more acclaimed and is considered by some critics to be a vast improvement on its first. On Metacritic, it holds a score of 84 out of 100, indicating "universal acclaim", based on 11 reviews. Linda Stasi of the New York Post gave the show's second season a perfect score, calling it "hilarious and even funnier this year than last." Tim Goodman of the San Francisco Chronicle also gave the show's second season a perfect score, praising the show's return, saying it "means there's finally something good (and funny) on Tuesday nights." Ken Tucker of Entertainment Weekly gave the show's return an A−, stating "Thank goodness Better Off Ted has returned intact. I love everything about this show, from star Jay Harrington's delivery of Ted's straight-man lines with WASP ramrod posture to the show's up-front critiques of corporate capitalism."

Ratings
The show's pilot episode averaged a total of 5.64 million viewers, which made it ABC's lowest-rated comedy debut since 2005. The show's first season continued to experience both a drop and mild fluctuation in ratings, taking in only 2.41 million for its finale. After being renewed, the show's second season premiered to a low 3.82 million viewers.

Awards and accolades
On TV.com, editorial assistant Anna Hiatt included the show in the website's list of The Best TV Shows of 2009. Josh Bell, a writer from About.com, ranked the series second on his list of The Best TV Comedies of 2010. In 2009, the show was nominated for an EWwy Award for Best Comedy Series.

Music video reunion
In mid-2011 series co-star Malcolm Barrett released his first single, "Revenge of the Nerds" under his alternate performance name, Verbal. The official music video for the song, released in June 2011, reunited all the major cast members of Better Off Ted, although only Barrett, Slavin and de Rossi reprised their original series characters (Harrington and Anders appear as a high school jock and a cheerleader, respectively, while series creator Victor Fresco also appears in the video). Barrett's recording is also included on the soundtrack of the final episode of Better Off Ted'', "Swag the Dog."

References

External links 

 

2000s American single-camera sitcoms
2010s American single-camera sitcoms
2000s American satirical television series
2010s American satirical television series
2000s American workplace comedy television series
2010s American workplace comedy television series
2000s American black comedy television series
2009 American television series debuts
2010 American television series endings
Television series by 20th Century Fox Television
American Broadcasting Company original programming
Television shows set in Los Angeles
Television series created by Victor Fresco